The 2003-04 Brown Bears women's ice hockey team represented Brown University.

Regular season
January 16: Jessica Link registered the 100th point of her career
For the second consecutive season, Jessica Link led the team in scoring. She registered 48 points (28 goals and 20 assists). Her 48 points ranked seventh overall in the ECAC. Link led the squad with seven goals on the power play while accumulating three game-winning goals.

Player stats

Skaters

Goaltenders

Awards and honors
Jessica Link, First Team All-Ivy
 Jessica Link, Second Team All-ECAC honors.

References

External links
Official site

Brown Bears women's ice hockey seasons
Brown
Brown
Brown